Christopher Rusdianto (born 22 September 1990) is an Indonesian badminton player.

Career 
Rusdianto comes from Suryanaga Surabaya badminton club, then in 2009 he joined the Indonesia national badminton team. In 2011, he became the runner-up at the India Grand Prix Gold tournament in the men's doubles event with Andrei Adistia. At the Giraldilla International tournament in Cuba, he became the champion in the men's and mixed doubles events. He also won the 2011 Bahrain International tournament with Adistia, after defeating top-ranked Indian pair and defending champions Rupesh Kumar and Sanave Thomas. In 2013, he became the champion at the Croatian International tournament in the men's doubles event partnered with Trikusuma Wardhana.

Achievements

BWF Grand Prix 
The BWF Grand Prix had two levels, the BWF Grand Prix and Grand Prix Gold. It was a series of badminton tournaments sanctioned by the Badminton World Federation (BWF) which was held from 2007 to 2017.

Men's doubles

  Grand Prix Gold Tournament
  Grand Prix Tournament

BWF International Challenge/Series 
Men's doubles

Mixed doubles

  BWF International Challenge tournament
  BWF International Series tournament
  BWF Future Series tournament

References

External links 
 
 

1990 births
Living people
Sportspeople from Surabaya
Indonesian male badminton players
20th-century Indonesian people
21st-century Indonesian people